Downtown Orlando is the historic core and central business district of Orlando, Florida, United States. It is bordered by Marks Street in the north, Mills Avenue (SR 15) in the east, Orange Blossom Trail (US 441) in the west, and Kaley Avenue in the south. There are several distinct neighborhoods in downtown; "North Quarter" to the north, "Lake Eola Heights Historic District" just north of Lake Eola, "South Eola" contains Lake Eola Park and continues to the east and south of Lake Eola, "Thornton Park" in the east, "Parramore" in the west, "Lake Cherokee Historic District" to the south, and the "Central Business District" (or the "Financial District") between Colonial Drive and Lake Lucerne in the center. In 2010, the estimated population of downtown was 18,731. The daytime population was estimated to be 65,000 (in 2010). The 5-mile radius population of downtown is 273,335.

Overview 
Downtown Orlando is the largest of urban centers in Central Florida. It is home to residential and commercial towers; local, state, and federal government offices; sports facilities; performing arts theaters; art galleries; retail; restaurants; nightclubs; and parks. Downtown is removed from the tourist areas located in the southwestern half of the city, but it draws visitors seeking to experience the "Real Orlando". It is also the location of numerous festivals, parades, concerts, political demonstrations, and other high-profile events.

Geography 

There are seven official neighborhoods with significant portions inside the Downtown Orlando Community Redevelopment Area (CRA):
Callahan (portion east of Westmoreland Drive)
Central Business District
Holden/Parramore (portion east of Westmoreland Drive)
Lake Dot (portion east of Westmoreland Drive)
Lake Eola Heights (portion west of Summerlin Avenue)
South Eola
North Quarter
City District 
The CRA also includes small pieces of College Park (portions east of Peachtree Road, and along Orange Avenue between Magnolia and Highland Avenues), Lake Cherokee (portions west of Delaney Avenue and north of Ponce de Leon Place / Palmer Street), Lorna Doone (Camping World Stadium only), Park Lake/Highland (portion north of Lake Highland), South Division (portion north of Gore Street, mostly highway right-of-way), South Orange (portion north of Gore Street), and Thornton Park (portion north of Central Boulevard and west of James Avenue).

North Quarter 
Located north of Colonial Drive, the border of this area is Interstate 4 to the west, and Highland Avenue to the east, the north border is N Orange Ave & the I-4 on-ramps at Lake Ivanhoe. This is a vibrant area that has seen many apartments and condominiums built, bringing a diverse collection of businesses including dining and shopping to the area. As one of the cheaper neighborhoods in the downtown area, with many artists including members of the Orlando Ballet and Orlando Opera making their home here. Diverse Word, the oldest open mic night in Orlando, is held at Downtown Credo North Quarter on Tuesday nights.  With such close proximity to the Central Business District for working professionals, this has become a valuable area for those who seek the convenience of work/play/live in downtown Orlando.

Parramore 

Established in the 1880s, Parramore is the historical hub of Orlando's African-American community. The area is located just west of the Central Business district along Division Ave and West Church Street. Now considered an economically depressed area, Orlando leaders are working with business owners in the community to improve the area's reputation. While some parts of the neighborhood have been gentrified, Parramore still maintains its historical African-American identity.

It is a residential area with a large number of high-intensity entertainment and office institutions; such as the Amway Center, Bob Carr Performing Arts Centre, US Courthouse for the Mid-District of Florida, Florida A&M University School of Law, county & state buildings, and Orlando Police Department headquarters. Smaller businesses include grocery stores, barber shops, and soul food restaurants.

Orlando officially considers Parramore to be three separate neighborhoods: Lake Dot (between Colonial Drive and Amelia Street), Callahan (between Amelia Street and Central Boulevard), and Holden/Parramore (between Central Boulevard and Gore Street). All three are bounded on the east by Interstate 4 and on the west by Orange Blossom Trail.

Central Business District 
The central business district is Orlando's Financial District and is the most recognized feature of downtown. The majority of Orlando's night clubs are also in this area. Located here are corporate offices for banks Wells Fargo, Seacoast, FifthThird Bank, and Suntrust banks, tech companies like Fat Merchant and Paycor, restaurants like Hawkers and Red Lobster, Orlando City Hall, foreign consulates, and many hotels. SunTrust Center and City Commons are two large office complexes within
the CBD. Church Street Station is also located in this area. Many of Orlando's historic buildings are located within the CBD standing next to modern skyscrapers. The Rogers Building (built in 1886), originally an English Gentlemen's Club built in the Queen Anne style, is the oldest building in downtown Orlando and now is home the Downtown Art's District.

The Downtown Arts District provides funding support, manages and operates CityArts—a multi-use arts and cultural destination where visual and performing arts co-exist inside the Roger's Building. Visited by more than 100,000 people annually, CityArts showcases an infusion of local and international works of art, and is home to six independently operated art galleries as well as art collective, Red Tape.

In addition to the plethora of bars and corporate offices, the district hosts several prominent theaters including the Mad Cow Theater  and Dr. Phillips Center for the Performing Arts, home to Steimetz Hall, one of the world's most acoustically perfect halls, designed to achieve an N1 sound rating.

Many major events take place in the Central Business District throughout the year. Creative City Project hosts the annual Immerse Arts Festival, an annual performing and interactive arts event. The festival takes place across 10 city blocks in Downtown Orlando every October. In November, the area outside of City Hall hosts FusionFest. The festival is sponsored by the Downtown Arts District and support from Orange County Government, the Orlando Downtown Development Board, the Dr. Phillips Center, and a growing grassroots movement.

Lake Eola

Lake Eola Park is located in South Eola, east of the CBD. The park is bordered by the Lake Eola Heights neighborhood north of the lake, South Eola Heights to the South and Thornton Park on the East side of the lake. The park is historically significant and is a frequent venue for events and festivals. The park's most iconic landmark is the Linton E. Allen Memorial Fountain (locally known as the Lake Eola Fountain), permanently embedded to the bottom with concrete beams in the center of the lake. The fountain is illuminated nightly in various colors with two nightly water shows.  In addition to the fountain, the park features swan boat rentals and the Walt Disney Amphitheater. Every Independence Day, the park is host to a large fireworks display which draws thousands of people to downtown. A  recreational pathway circles the park and leads to a playground.

Lake Eola Heights is unique in Orlando as it contains some of the oldest homes in the city and is one of Orlando's historic districts. There are many historical "Florida style" bungalows and century-old oak lined brick streets.

Thornton Park 

Thornton Park is located one city block east of Lake Eola Park. The streets creating its border are: Summerlin Ave, E Robinson St, N Brown Ave, E Central Blvd to S Hyer Ave, and S Hyer Ave south to Florida State Road 408. The area is similar to the Lake Eola Heights neighborhood in that it contains historic homes and the streets are paved with bricks, although it is roughly half the size. Thornton Park also enjoys a handful of small restaurants, bars and boutiques along E Washington St. The neighborhood also has a small fountain located in the center of the intersection of E Washington St & N Hyer Ave which has become a focal point, and is described here: The Fountain is a replica of a fountain found in a Paris city center that is 25 times its size. In 1999 the "Taste of Thornton Park Event" was organized specifically to raise enough money to purchase the Thornton Park Fountain for around $17,000 + $23,000 for fountain foundation. Howard Middle School, which was the original Orlando High School, is located here.

History

Early years 
Prior to the arrival of European settlers in 1837, the Orlando area was occupied by the Native American Creek and Seminole tribes. In 1838, Fort Gatlin was built a few miles south of downtown Orlando on the shores of modern-day Lake Gatlin; (a historic marker is now located on the fort site). In 1850, a man named Aaron Jernigan built a post office north of the fort and the area became known as "Jernigan". In 1856, Jernigan was relieved of his command of the post office due to "notorious acts" and the area was renamed "Orlando". The village remained little more than a backwater during and after the Civil War until 1875 when The "Town of Orlando" was incorporated. It was centered around the original Orange County Courthouse in between today's Court Avenue and Magnolia Avenue (originally named "Main Street").

A fire in 1884 almost destroyed the entire town. Before the fire, most of the structures in Orlando were built with wood and the town was without fire protection. The town began to rebuild and a fire brigade was formed. Orlando became a city in 1885 and the arrival of the Atlantic Coast Line Railroad in 1890 brought tremendous growth. Commercial activity shifted away from the courthouse and moved to the new railroad depot located on Church Street. Settlers from England arrived in Orlando and established homes and businesses. One of the newly arrived Englishmen was named Joseph Bumby. He and his family settled in the town and built a hardware store known as "Bumby Hardware Store". The store remained an Orlando fixture until the 1960s, but the name "Bumby" is still famous in the city. The location of the hardware store is now a Hamburger Mary's.

Downtown's heyday 
By the 1920s, Orlando had grown from a cattle town to a major citrus growing center. The Florida land boom of the 1920s brought many newcomers to the city. The population increase led to the construction of the Orlando Public Library in 1923, the Orlando Municipal Auditorium (now Bob Carr Performing Arts Centre) in 1926, and several grand hotels; namely the Angebilt Hotel and San Juan Hotel. By this time, the city's population had grown to 9,000 people.

Great Depression to post-war years 
The federal government's Works Progress Administration programs during the Great Depression helped Orlando remain economically stable. New parks were developed, the Municipal Airport (now Orlando Executive Airport) was built, and the city also built a new football stadium at Tinker Field (now the site of Florida Citrus Bowl). By 1944, enough jobs were created to increase the city's population to 45,000 people. Orlando became a major military center when World War II brought the development of McCoy Air Force Base and Pinecastle AFB, located southeast of downtown. This status intensified with the 1968 opening of the Orlando Naval Training Center east of downtown.

Decline and redevelopment 
Walt Disney World's 1971 opening in southwest Orange County brought major development to Orlando, but relatively little to the downtown area. During this time, development in downtown was mainly focused upon the construction of office towers, such as the Citrus Center and the original Sunbank building. However, downtown began to fall into a state of decline. The Angebilt Hotel and San Juan Hotel were abandoned and left to crumble. The San Juan was eventually demolished in 1980, but the Angebilt Hotel at 37 N Orange Ave which was built in 1923 would be transformed in modern times into an office building with retail on the ground floor. Lake Eola Park became a haven for prostitutes and drug addicts. In addition, downtown department stores and family owned businesses closed or moved to the newly constructed Orlando Fashion Square mall. After the opening of Interstate 4, the downtown population base moved out of downtown to the suburbs.

Efforts to revitalize downtown began in the mid-1970s and continued into the 1980s. Bob Snow opened Rosie O'Grady's in 1974 at Church Street Station, which quickly became a popular attraction. In the mid-1980s, several skyscrapers were constructed; including SunTrust Center and Barnett Plaza (now Bank of America Center). Lake Eola Park was redesigned and the Walt Disney Amphitheater opened in the park around the same time the annual "Orlando Shakespeare Festival" was established. On the other hand, downtown's population base still had yet to rebound to previous levels and major corporations were still opening locations outside of the city center.

The Orlando City Hall building, the city's third, opened in 1991 directly behind the previous City Hall, constructed in 1958. To clear the area for future development, the Orlando City Council chose to implode the 1950s building. The event was met with much local fanfare and was filmed for use in the opening scenes of the 1992 film Lethal Weapon 3. The area cleared is now occupied by CNL City Center Commons.

Recent years 
Until the late 1990s, downtown was relatively small compared to other cities of Orlando's size. A building boom began in 1998 and continued through the 2000s decade. New commercial towers sprouted along Orange Avenue and residential towers were constructed around Lake Eola and along Magnolia Ave. CNL Financial Group established a major footprint in downtown with the construction of CNL City Center Commons, a complex of office towers surrounding Orlando City Hall. CNL continues to expand their presence downtown. As a result of the construction boom, downtown density doubled and Orlando's skyline dramatically changed. In 2005, the term "Manhattanization" was locally applied to Orange Avenue when a large number of construction cranes loomed over downtown. The late 2000s recession slowed large intensity skyscraper construction; but infill development continued downtown including construction of the Amway Center in 2009.

In 2011, construction began on phase one of the long-awaited Dr. Phillips Center for the Performing Arts across from City Hall along Orange Ave.

High-rise buildings 
The majority of the tallest towers in Central Florida are located downtown. Of the 79 existing high-rises in the Greater Orlando region, 46 are located downtown.

The tallest high-rises in Orlando are:
 Suntrust Center, 1988,  is the tallest building in Central Florida.
 The Vue at Lake Eola, 2008, 
 The Orange County Courthouse, 1997, 
 The Bank of America Center, 1988, 
 55 West on the Esplanade, 2009, 
 Solaire at the Plaza, 2006, 
 One Eleven Building, 2009, 
 SunTrust Center at Church Street Station, Under Construction, 326 ft (100 m)
Citi Tower, 2017, 
 Modera Central, 2018, 260 ft (80m)
Citrus Center, 1971, 
 Premier Trade Plaza Orlando, 2006, 
 CNL Center City Commons, 1999, 

Towers built in downtown Orlando have not exceeded  since the completion of the Suntrust Center in 1988. There has never been an "official" reason why, but local architects speculate it is due to the Orlando Executive Airport location just east of downtown. The airport's flight path is over the city center, thus the Federal Aviation Administration has imposed height restrictions.

Transportation 
Downtown Orlando is served by three main arteries, two limited access highways, several secondaries, and many byways.

Limited Access
 Spessard L. Holland East-West Expressway (SR 408)
 Interstate 4 (SR 400)

Arterials
 Orange Avenue (SR 527 - One Way SB)
 Rosalind Avenue (SR 527 - One Way NB)
 Colonial Drive (US 17/92-SR 50 - E/W)
 Orange Blossom Trail (US 441 - N/S)

Secondaries
 South Street (SR 15 - WB Along SR 408)
 Anderson Street (SR 15 - EB Along SR 408)
 Hughey Avenue (SB Along I-4)
 Garland Avenue (NB Along I-4)
 Robinson Avenue (E/W Along North Side of Lake Eola)
 Central Avenue (E/W) Along South Side of Lake Eola)

Public transportation

Bus

The Central Florida Regional Transportation Authority (CFRTA), better known as Lynx, operates the regional bus service with its central station and offices located at 455 N Garland Avenue.

Lynx Operates a zero-fare bus route called Lymmo (Link 31) along a completely separate and dedicated right-of-way. Because this bus system runs on its own right-of-way and controls the traffic signaling, in most cases it is superior to automobile travel within the downtown area. Lymmo service also runs along the Orange Avenue corridor, north to Florida Hospital and south to Michigan Avenue. There is also an east/west connection from the Citrus Bowl to South Eola.

Rail

Downtown is served by an Amtrak station about a mile south of the central business district.  The Silver Meteor and Silver Star lines provide train service to New York City, Miami and Tampa.

Construction began in 2012 on SunRail, a north–south commuter rail that will run mostly along existing CSX/Amtrak rails. Launched in 2014, it provides service between the northern suburb of DeLand to the southern suburb of Poinciana. A large transfer station, the LYNX Central Station, currently handles Lynx bus transfers and was constructed to accommodate the large capacity expected from SunRail. Further development is underway to extend the service to multiple additional points south. Connections to the Orlando International Airport (MCO) and to other lines connecting to South Florida (All Aboard Florida) are being evaluated.

Air

While technically not in downtown proper, the airport serves the downtown district.

Government 
Orlando City Hall is located on Orange Avenue and South Street.

The Orange County Courthouse is located on north Orange Avenue.

The US District Court Middle District of Florida's courthouse is located at 401 West Central Boulevard.

The United States Postal Service downtown office is located at 51 East Jefferson Street.

Education and institutions

Public and private schools 
 Lake Highland Preparatory School
 Howard Middle School
 Hillcrest Elementary School
 Trinity Lutheran School
 Fern Creek Elementary
 Jones High School
 William R. Boone High School
 The Christ School
 Blankner K-8

Colleges 
 Valencia Community College - satellite campus
 University of Central Florida - Downtown Campus
 UCF - Florida Interactive Entertainment Academy
 Florida A&M University - School of Law
 Florida State University College of Medicine - Orlando Regional Campus
 Adventist University of Health Sciences - Main Campus

Places of worship 
 First Presbyterian Church of Orlando
 First United Methodist Church of Orlando
 St. James Cathedral in Orlando
 First United Methodist Church
 Hospital Church
 Masjid Al Haq Mosque
 Trinity Lutheran Church
 Downtown Baptist Church
 Park Lake Presbyterian Church
 City Beautiful Church
 Summit Church
 Celebration Church
 Cathedral Church of St. Luke
 Mt. Zion Missionary Baptist Institutional Church

Hospitals 
 Florida Hospital Orlando
 Orlando Regional Medical Center
 Arnold Palmer Hospital for Children
 Winnie Palmer Hospital for Women and Babies
 M. D. Anderson Cancer Center Orlando
 ORMC - Lucerne Pavilion

Places of interest 
Loch Haven Park, north of downtown on Mills and Princeton Avenues, serves as the cultural center of Orlando and consists of the following:
 The Orlando Science Center
 The Orlando Shakespeare Theater
 The Orlando Museum of Art
 The Orlando Repertory Theatre
 The Mennello Museum of American Art
 Loch Haven Community Center
The Dr. Phillips Center

The "Cultural Park Master Plan" published in 2009, details plans to expand Loch Haven Park to former USDA property located adjacent the park, and calling for additional cultural institutions to be housed onsite.

Arts and culture 
 Calle Orange, an annual heritage festival celebrating Puerto Rican culture.
 The Orange County Regional History Center - Located on Central Blvd. The building was once the Orange County Courthouse.
 Mad Cow Theatre produces a season of classical and contemporary plays and musicals in its intimate two-theatre complex.
 CityArts Factory - Located in the CBD. Features works by local artists and holds workshops.
 SAK Comedy Lab -  A 200-seat professional improvisation comedy theater and school, with graduates including Wayne Brady, Jonathan Mangum, Karey Kirkpatrick.
 Plaza Cinema Cafe - The first movie theater in downtown in nearly half a century.
 The Daily City Mobile Art Show - An art gallery in the back of a moving truck which displays works by local artists in various locations around Central Florida.
 Public Art - Orange County Government has several public art installations around Downtown.
 The Orlando Cabaret Festival - an annual festival produced east spring by Mad Cow Theatre attracts local and international Cabaret artists for over 40 performances at the theatre.  Features lunchtime and evening performances and special events.
 The Orlando Film Festival
 Orlando International Fringe Theater Festival

Hotels 
Major hotels in downtown Orlando include:
 Crowne Plaza Orlando Downtown Hotel
 Embassy Suites Orlando - Downtown
 Grand Bohemian Hotel Orlando (Marriott)
 Sheraton Orlando Downtown Hotel
 DoubleTree by Hilton - Orlando Downtown

Sports 
Downtown is home to the Amway Center which hosts the Orlando Magic NBA team, the Orlando Solar Bears ECHL team, and the Orlando Predators Arena Football League team. Camping World Stadium in addition to being home of the Orlando Guardians XFL team and Orlando City Soccer Club for 2015 & 2016 also hosts The Capital One Bowl in addition to other events year round. Tinker Field was a historic ballpark adjacent to Camping World Stadium.

Diplomatic missions 
 Mexican Consulate Orlando
 Consulate of Haiti Orlando
 French Consulate Orlando
 Argentine Consulate Orlando
 Consulate of the Ivory Coast - Orlando
 Dutch Consulate in Orlando
 Austrian Consulate in Orlando
 Jamaican Consulate Orlando

Resulting from Orlando's reputation as a major international destination and many countries establishing consulates in the city, Orlando now has the second highest number of foreign consulates in Florida next to Miami.

Popular culture 
Downtown Orlando's skyline can be seen in the films Paper Towns, Passenger 57, Ernest Saves Christmas, D.A.R.Y.L., Larry the Cable Guy: Health Inspector, Lethal Weapon 3 (doubled for Los Angeles), and Miami Connection.

Seven Mary Three's fourth studio album is entitled Orange Avenue.

Redevelopment 
The Triple Crown for Downtown, a construction initiative involving three high intensity public works projects, began in 2010 and is almost complete.

 Amway Center - The first initiative of the Triple Crown. Construction began in 2008 and was completed in October, 2010. It is the new home of the Orlando Magic. In addition to other events, the venue has brought major concerts back to Orlando (the former "Amway Arena" was deemed too small for major concerts by promoters).
 Dr. Phillips Center for the Performing Arts - Located across from City Hall on Orange Ave, it replaced the Bob Carr Performing Arts Centre and is being built in phases. Phase I is already complete with a 2,800 seat amplified hall and a 300-seat theater for smaller productions. Phase II, currently under construction, will include a 1,700 seat acoustic hall for ballet, orchestra, and opera performances.
 Camping World Stadium - Located to the west of downtown and formerly named "The Florida Citrus Bowl", is an outdoor venue for sports and large events. The stadium was 80% rebuilt with construction completing in 2017.

A more ambitious project currently under construction is completely transforming the Orlando Centroplex, the home of the former Amway Arena, into a "Creative Village". The project is privately funded with satellite schools for the University of Central Florida and the University of Florida,  of office space, residential apartment buildings, and a large central park with sporting facilities and an amphitheater.

References

External links 

 Downtown Development Board/Community Redevelopment Agency
 Downtown Arts District
 Downtown Orlando Information Center

Economy of Orlando, Florida
Neighborhoods in Orlando, Florida
Orlando